Il Bacio di Tosca (Tosca's Kiss in the US) is a 1984 film directed by Daniel Schmid, a documentary of life in the Casa di Riposo per Musicisti of Milan, the world's first nursing home for retired opera singers, founded by composer Giuseppe Verdi in 1896. The New York Times review called it "Bravissimo!" 

Dustin Hoffman cited Il Bacio di Tosca as a direct inspiration for his 2012 film Quartet.

Plot
The film follows retired soprano Sara Scuderi and the other tenants of the retirement home, as they re-live and re-enact the roles which made them famous.

Cast
 Sara Scuderi
 Giuseppe Manacchini
 Giulietta Simionato
 Leonida Bellon
 Salvatore Locapo
 Giovanni Puligheddu
 Della Benning
 Cesare Perugia
 Giuseppina Sani
 Giulia Scaramelli

Awards
The film received the Georges Delerue Prize for Best Musical Documentary at the Ghent International Film Festival in 1985 and the International Documentary Association IDA Award in 1986.

References

External links
 
 Il Bacio di Tosca at Classical.Net
 Il Bacio di Tosca  at Daniel Schmid's pages

1984 films
Swiss documentary films
1984 documentary films
Documentary films about old age
Documentary films about singers
Documentary films about opera
Films shot in Italy
Films directed by Daniel Schmid
Georges Delerue Award winners
1980s Italian-language films